Darrel G. McHargue (born September 26, 1954 in Oklahoma City, Oklahoma) is a retired American Champion jockey in Thoroughbred horse racing. One of five children from a family not connected to horse racing, he was first introduced to riding as a teenage boy when he rode a neighbor's Quarter Horse. He was 17 years old when he made his professional debut in 1972 at Churchill Downs in Louisville, Kentucky. The following year he was the leading rider at Laurel Park Racecourse in Laurel, Maryland.

Triple Crown races
Darrel McHargue competed in eight Kentucky Derbys between 1974 and 1986. His best finishes were a second with Run Dusty Run in 1977 and a third with actor Jack Klugman's colt Jaklin Klugman in 1980.

In 1975, the twenty-year-old McHargue earned the most important win of his career when he rode Master Derby to victory in the Preakness Stakes, the second leg of the U.S. Triple Crown series.

McHargue had two mounts in the Belmont Stakes, finishing third with Master Derby in 1975 and second with McKenzie Bridge in 1976.

1978 Championship
McHargue was the leading jockey at the 1977 Oak Tree Racing Association fall meet. The next year would be the best of his career. He rode six winners in one day at Santa Anita Park on March 5, 1978 and again on October 25, 1979. In 1978, he was the leading money-winning jockey in the United States with a record $6,188,353 and was voted the Eclipse Award as the United States' Outstanding Jockey. In addition, he was voted the 1978 George Woolf Memorial Jockey Award presented by Santa Anita Park to the jockey in North America who demonstrates high standards of personal and professional conduct, on and off the racetrack.

Beginning in 1980, McHargue rode the great John Henry in eleven of his starts,  winning such races as the San Juan Capistrano Handicap, Hollywood Invitational Turf Handicap, San Gabriel Handicap, San Luis Rey Handicap, and San Marcos Stakes.

European racing
A proven rider on turf, in 1983 McHargue moved to a base in Ireland, where he rode for various trainers including Luca Cumani and Dermot Weld and for owners such as the American husband and wife team of Bertram and Diana Firestone and Englishman Ivan Allan. In 1984, he was the stable jockey for Cumani and had ridden  Allan's outstanding colt Commanche Run in most of his races . Commanche Run had, however, put up a vastly improved performance in the Gordon Stakes under Lester Piggott when McHargue was suspended . McHargue was scheduled to ride Commanche Run in the St. Leger Stakes. However, Piggott replaced McHargue shortly before the race at the instigation of Ivan Allan  Commanche Run won the British Classic by a neck in a very close finish under a superb ride from Piggott. McHargue soon returned home to Pasadena, California. 

McHargue retired from riding in early April 1988 and began a new career a few weeks later as a racing official. In 1994, he graduated from the Racing Officials Accreditation Program (ROAP). He worked at northern California tracks and in 2005 was appointed a race steward at Hollywood Park.

McHargue is married to Robin McHargue, daughter of the late trainer Robert Wingfield.

References

External links
 Darrel McHargue at the official Kentucky Derby website
 Profile and photo of Darrel McHargue at Sportscaster Sports Cards
 February 20, 1978 Sports Illustrated article on Darrel McHargue
 November 30, 1997 article in The Independent on Darrel McHargue, Lester Piggott, and the 1984 St. Leger Stakes

1954 births
Living people
American jockeys
American Champion jockeys
Eclipse Award winners
Sportspeople from Oklahoma City